"Your Time Will Come" is a 2010 single release by Scottish recording artist Amy Macdonald, released as the fifth single from her second studio album A Curious Thing (2010). It was the first time one of her singles had failed to chart anywhere in Europe.

Track listing 
Digital download (iTunes EP):
 "Your Time Will Come" – 4:32'
 "Your Time Will Come (live with the Deutsche Radio Philharmonie Orchestra)" – 3:38'
 "Your Time Will Come (Video)" – 3:48'

See also 
 A Curious Thing
 Amy Macdonald

External links 
Your Time Will Come – lyrics & chords
Amy Macdonald – Amy Macdonald official site

References 

2010 singles
Amy Macdonald songs
Songs written by Amy Macdonald
2010 songs
Mercury Records singles